Enid Is Sleeping (released on television and home video as Over Her Dead Body) is a 1990 dark comedy film directed by Maurice Phillips, starring Judge Reinhold, Elizabeth Perkins and Jeffrey Jones.

Plot 
The film begins with a flashback to a household in Las Moscas, New Mexico, in the year 1959. The mother, Mrs. Pearly, is completely overwhelmed managing her household chores, her children Enid and June, and their visiting friend Harry. Angry and vicious, Enid puts her baby sister June into the oven while her mother is off for a moment to receive Harry's mother.

25 years later, Enid, now joined with Harry in an unloving marriage, returns home to unexpectedly find him having an affair with June. Reacting violently, she prepares to shoot them with Harry's police service gun; June smashes a vase on her head, apparently killing her. Panicking, they decide to make Enid's death look like a car accident while she and June went visiting their mother; but complications arise when Harry's partner Floyd unwittingly gets in their way and a guiltridden June begins holding a monologue with Enid to rid herself of her pangs of conscience, delaying her in getting rid of the body.

While transporting Enid's body to a dangerous road curve in the desert for the staging, June discovers that an actual accident has occurred there. Moreover, a drunken trucker attempts to hit on both her and Enid, forcing her to shake him off and thus putting Harry and Floyd on her case. After unsuccessfully trying to push the car off a cliff, she attempts to simply dump Enid in the middle of the desert, but gets herself stuck near an Indian burial ground. Leaving the body, she calls Harry from a gas station for help; en route, Harry abandons Floyd at a rest stop, but right afterwards Floyd gets involved in an attempted armed robbery and shoots one of the robbers, sending his partner fleeing.

After retrieving the body with Harry's help, June takes a stop at a road motel, but gets an unbidden visitation from the drunk trucker, causing the motel's manager to throw them out. Forced to a stop by a fallen tree, she pushes the car into the nearby Sanchez River, but a young couple sees her and calls in the police. Harry dumps Floyd once again and aids June into pulling the car out of the river. While driving home, June falls asleep at the wheel and wrecks a billboard, causing a state trooper to pull her over; but when he opens the trunk, he is knocked out by Enid, who is, though groggy, in fact very much alive.

June deposites Enid at her home, but while driving away, she is kidnapped by the fugitive robber. Suffering a nervous breakdown, she begins to drive wildly, causing the robber to drop a lit cigarette into a puddle of leaking gasoline, which blows up the car, killing the robber. With the body burned beyond recognition, and with Enid's cigarette case found in the wreck, everyone in town, including Harry, assumes that Enid was the victim. Elated, Harry returns home, only to find a slightly scorched June and the still-living - and extremely furious - Enid waiting for him.

Cast 

 Elizabeth Perkins as June Pearly
 Judge Reinhold as Harry Hopper
 Jeffrey Jones as Floyd
 Maureen Mueller as Enid Pearly
 Rhea Perlman as Mavis
 Brion James as George the Trucker
 Charles Tyner as Man at Indian Burial Site
 Henry Jones as Old Man
 Michael J. Pollard as Motel Manager
Nicolas Love as Robber #1
Alex Chapman as Robber #2

Reception
The film received "lukewarm" reviews and was a box office failure. It currently has a rating of 42% on the census website Rotten Tomatoes, based on 171 user ratings.

References

External links
 
 

1990 films
1990s black comedy films
1990s crime comedy films
American black comedy films
American crime comedy films
1990s English-language films
Films about adultery in the United States
Films produced by John Davis
Films scored by Craig Safan
Films set in New Mexico
Films shot in New Mexico
1990 comedy films
1990s American films